Chongqing Guangyangba Airport, also known as Guangyangba Air Base, was a military and civil airport in China, located about  east of Chongqing. This airport was built by the warlord Liu Xiang in 1929 as a military base. It was the first airport built in southwestern China.

The airport
The airport was located on Guangyang Isle. During World War II, this airport was one of the seven airports in the Chongqing region used for the air defense of the China's capital city. However, during the rainy season, when the civil airport of Chongqing (the Shanhuba Airport) was not suitable for landing, Guangyangba Airport also served as a civil aviation station for Chongqing region. After the opening of Chongqing Baishiyi Air Base, Guangyangba Airport was gradually abandoned.

The location
It is located at the down-stream mouth of Tongluo Valley.

References

Airports in Chongqing
Defunct airports in China
Airports established in 1929
1929 establishments in China